Bitz is a municipality of Baden-Württemberg, Germany.

Bitz may also refer to:

People
Hermann Bitz, a retired footballer from Germany.
Bertrand Bitz, a singer from Switzerland.
Byron Bitz, a former Canadian hockey player who acts a winger.
Cecilia Bitz, American climatologist.
Carl Bitz, Swiss diplomat and inventor.
Konrad Bitz, bishop of Turku in Finland.
Michael Bitz, German economist.
Hein Bitz, German folk and street dancer.

Other use
A character in Bitz & Bob